Dinara Nursultanqyzy Nazarbayeva (born 19 August 1967) is a Kazakh billionaire heiress, businesswoman and the middle daughter of former Kazakh President Nursultan Nazarbayev. She is married to Timur Kulibayev, a Kazakh oligarch.

She is the second richest person in Kazakhstan, with a fortune estimated to be around $3.8 billion. During 2022 Kazakh protests she lost $200 million in fortune according to Forbes.

Biography 
Nazarbayeva was born in Temirtau, Kazakh SSR, Soviet Union.  Comes from the Shaprashta clan of the Senior Zhuz.

In 1989, she graduated from the Russian Institute of Theatre Arts.

In 1998, she received her MBA from KIMEP University.

In 2007, she defended her doctoral dissertation on "Methodological foundations of the management of the educational system of international schools."

In 2009, she heads the National Education Fund named after Nursultan Nazarbayev.

Personal life
She is married to Timur Kulibayev in 1990 and the couple have three children: a son and two daughters. Her husband is a prominent businessman in Kazakhstan, being the third-richest man in Kazakhstan and the 973rd-richest in the world.

Awards and honors
 Order of the Leopard, 3rd class (Kazakhstan)
 Order of Parasat (Kazakhstan)
 Knight of the Ordre des Palmes académiques (France)
Academician of the National Academy of Sciences of the Republic of Kazakhstan (2017)

References

Kazakhstani businesspeople
1967 births
Kazakhstani billionaires
Living people
Nursultan Nazarbayev family
Children of national leaders
Recipients of the Order of Parasat
Chevaliers of the Ordre des Palmes Académiques